Rolling Stone Original is the sixth EP by the rock band Papa Roach. The EP was recorded in 2004 and released on November 9, 2004. The EP is only available digitally.

Track listing

Personnel
 Jacoby Shaddix - lead vocals
 Jerry Horton - guitar, backing vocals
 Tobin Esperance - bass, backing vocals
 Dave Buckner - drums

References

Papa Roach EPs
2004 EPs
Live EPs